This is a list of hospitals in Australian Capital Territory, Australia.

Calvary Hospital, Canberra
Canberra Eye Hospital
Canberra Hospital
The National Capital Private Hospital
Calvary John James Hospital

Australian Capital Territory
Hospitals
 
Hospitals
Hospitals